Mayuri Deshmukh (born 3 September 1992) is an Indian television and film actress. She is known for portraying Manasi Deshpande in Zee Marathi's Khulta Kali Khulena. In November 2020 (till September 2022), she was playing Prof. Malini Chaturvedi in StarPlus's Imlie.

Early life 
Mayuri Deshmukh was born on 3 September 1992 in Dhule, Maharashtra. She belongs to a middle class Hindu family. Prabhakar Deshmukh, Hema More Deshmukh are her parents. She has two brothers Anup Deshmukh and Kunal Deshmukh in the family. Due to her father’s government job, she studied in different parts of the country like Pune, Nanded, Mumbai, Visakhapatnam etc.

She completed her schooling from Rishi Vidyalaya Gurukulam in Visakhapatnam and various schools in the country. After which Mayuri completed graduation in BDS (Bachelor of Dental Science) from Navi-Mumbai’s Dr. D.Y. Patil Dental College and Hospital.

Career 
Mayuri started her formal career with the debut in a Marathi film Dr. Prakash Baba Amte – The Real Hero in 2014. later, she worked in a play named Pleasent surprise. 

She rose to fame all over Maharashtra with popular Marathi television show Khulta Kali Khulena, aired on Zee Marathi, where she played lead character of Manasi Deshpande.

Later she played a lead character of Mugdha in a film 31 Divas (2018) the character too, was appreciated by the audience across Maharashtra. In 2018, she played a character of Shanu aka Shanaya in her first written play as a writer, Dear Aajo, for which she got much appreciation. Also, she has played a character of Charu aka Charusheela in a play named Teesre Badshah Hum.

Also, she has worked in films like Grey (2018) and Lagna Kallol (2019) which are to be released soon. From 2020 to 2022, she was portraying Prof. Malini Chaturvedi in StarPlus's Imlie opposite Gashmeer Mahajani, Sumbul Touqeer Khan, and Fahmaan Khan.

Filmography

Films

Television

Theaters

References

External links
 

1992 births
Living people
Marathi actors